The Upper Midwest Athletic Conference (UMAC) is a college-level athletic conference. The UMAC is a conference of NCAA Division III since the 2008–09 season. Corey Borchardt is the current commissioner of the UMAC, and was appointed to the position in 2008.  The UMAC was started in 1972 as the Twin Rivers Conference, and assumed its current name in 1983. Member institutions are located in Minnesota and Wisconsin.

The UMAC sponsors intercollegiate competition in men's baseball, men's and women's basketball, men's and women's cross country, men's football, men's and women's golf, men's and women's soccer, women's softball, men's and women's tennis, men's and women's indoor and outdoor track and field, and women's volleyball.

Greenville College and Westminster College became associate members of the UMAC in football in 2009 and Finlandia University in 2021.

In March 2023, Finlandia announced it was closing.

History

Chronological timeline
 1972 - The UMAC was founded as the Twin Rivers Conference (TRC), originally an athletic conference affiliated with the National Association of Intercollegiate Athletics (NAIA). Charter members included Concordia College, Saint Paul (now Concordia University, Saint Paul), Dr. Martin Luther College, Loras College, Mount Senario College, Northwestern College of Minnesota (now the University of Northwestern – St. Paul), Northwestern College of Wisconsin and Pillsbury Baptist Bible College, effective beginning the 1972-73 academic year.
 1974 - Maranatha Baptist Bible College (now Maranatha Baptist University) joined the TWC as an associate member for football, effective in the 1974 fall season (1974-75 academic year).
 1976 - Viterbo College (now Vitberbo University) joined the TWC, effective in the 1976-77 academic year.
 1983 - The TRC has been rebranded as the Upper Midwest Athletic Conference, effective in the 1983-84 academic year.
 1986 - Loras left the UMAC, effective after the 1985-86 academic year.
 1988 - Pillsbury Baptist Bible and Viterbo left the UMAC, effective after the 1987-88 academic year.
 1994 - Crown College joined the UMAC, effective in the 1994-95 academic year.
 1995 - Dr. Martin Luther and Northwestern (Wisc.) merged to become Martin Luther College. Both institutions therefore left the UMAC as a result of the merger, effective after the 1994-95 academic year. And immediately Martin Luther joined the UMAC, effective beginning the 1995-96 academic year.
 1995 - The College of St. Scholastica joined the UMAC, effective in the 1995-96 academic year.
 1997 - Trinity Bible College joined the UMAC as an associate member for football, effective in the 1997 fall season (1997-98 academic year).
 1998 - Northland College of Wisconsin joined the UMAC, effective in the 1998-99 academic year.
 1999 - Concordia Saint Paul left the UMAC to join the Division II ranks of the National Collegiate Athletic Association (NCAA) and the Northern Sun Intercollegiate Conference (NSIC), effective after the 1998-99 academic year.
 2002 - Mount Scenario disbanded its athletics program in December 2001 without completing the rest of the 2001-02 academic year. Later on, the school closed on 31 August 2002.
 2002 - Presentation College of South Dakota joined the UMAC, effective in the 2002-03 academic year.
 2002 - Blackburn College, Principia College, Rockford College (now Rockford University) and Westminster College joined the UMAC as associate members for football, effective in the 2002 fall season (2002-03 academic year).
 2003 - The University of Minnesota at Morris joined the UMAC, effective in the 2003-04 academic year.
 2004 - Bethany Lutheran College joined the UMAC, effective in the 2004-05 academic year.
 2008 - Blackburn, Principia, Maranatha Baptist, Rockford, Trinity Bible and Westminster (Mo.) left the UMAC as associate members for football, effective after the 2007 fall season (2007-08 academic year).
 2008 - The UMAC had become affiliated with the Division III ranks of the NCAA, effective in the 2008-09 academic year.
 2008 - North Central University joined the UMAC as an associate member for certain sports, effective in the 2008-09 academic year.
 2009 - Eureka College, Greenville College (now Greenville University) and MacMurray College joined the UMAC as associate members for football (with Westminster (Mo.) re-joining back), effective in the 2009 fall season (2009-10 academic year).
 2012 - Presentation left the UMAC to join the NAIA and the North Star Athletic Association (NSAA), effective after the 2011-12 academic year.
 2013 - North Central (Minn.) became a full member of the UMAC for all sports, effective in the 2013-14 academic year.
 2013 - Iowa Wesleyan College (now Iowa Wesleyan University) joined the UMAC as an associate member for football, effective in the 2013 fall season (2013-14 academic year).
 2015 - The University of Wisconsin–Superior joined the UMAC, effective in the 2015-16 academic year.
 2018 - Eureka left the UMAC as an associate member for football, effective after the 2017 fall season (2017-18 academic year).
 2020 - MacMurray left the UMAC as an associate member for football as the school would later drop its athletics program and be closed, effective after the 2019-20 academic year.
 2021 - Iowa Wesleyan left the UMAC as an associate member for football, effective after the 2020 fall season (2020-21 academic year).
 2021 - St. Scholastica left the UMAC to join the Minnesota Intercollegiate Athletic Conference (MIAC), effective after the 2020-21 academic year.
 2021 - Finlandia University joined the UMAC as an associate member for football, effective in the 2021 fall season (2021-22 academic year).
 2023 - Finlandia announces it will not enroll new students fall 2023, confirming their upcoming closure of the school.

Member schools

Current members

Full members
The UMAC currently has eight full members, all but two are private schools:

Notes

Associate members
The UMAC currently has three associate members, all are private schools:

Notes

Former members

Full members
The UMAC had nine former full members, which all were private schools:

Notes

Associate members
The UMAC had eight former associate members, all were private schools. School names and nicknames reflect those in use during the final school year in which each competed in the UMAC.

Notes

Membership timeline

Conference sports

Conference facilities

Football champions

*- 2011 was the first year the UMAC Champion received an automatic bid to the NCAA Division III Playoffs.

Ice hockey affiliations
The UMAC does not sponsor ice hockey. Two UMAC member schools sponsor men's and women's ice hockey as a varsity sport. Northland College and UW-Superior are members of the Wisconsin Intercollegiate Athletic Conference.

References

External links
 

 
College sports in Minnesota
College sports in Wisconsin